The 2013 NASCAR Canadian Tire Series season is the seventh season of the NASCAR Canadian Tire Series taking place in the summer of 2013. The season composed of twelve races at ten different venues. Seven of those events were contested on oval courses.

Summary
The seventh season consists of 12 events spanning across 5 provinces featuring 12 events. Television rights are once again licensed to TSN in one-hour tape-delayed episodes, excluding both events at the  Canadian Tire Motorsport Park road course which will be aired live on TSN and CTV.

The season started on May 19 at the newly renovated Canadian Tire Motorsport Park with Louis-Philippe Dumoulin collecting his first series win with longtime veteran Jeff Lapcevich finishing second. After a two-year hiatus the series is set to return to the Autodrome St. Eustache on 27 July as the events in Montreal and Edmonton Airport will not return the calendar.

Drivers

Schedule

Results

Races

Championship standings

Notes
1 –  Jason Hankewich received championship points, despite the fact that he did not qualify for the race.

See also
2013 NASCAR Sprint Cup Series
2013 NASCAR Nationwide Series
2013 NASCAR Camping World Truck Series
2013 NASCAR K&N Pro Series East
2013 NASCAR K&N Pro Series West
2013 ARCA Racing Series
2013 NASCAR Toyota Series
2013 NASCAR Whelen Euro Series

References

External links
Canadian Tire Series Standings and Statistics for 2013

NASCAR Canadian Tire Series season

NASCAR Pinty's Series